Lecithocera erecta is a moth in the family Lecithoceridae. It is found in the provinces of Zhejiang, Anhui, Jiangxi, Hunan, Fujian, Sichuan and Yunnan in China and in Taiwan.

The wingspan is 13–14 mm.

References

Moths described in 1935
erecta